Belgweiler is an Ortsgemeinde – a municipality belonging to a Verbandsgemeinde, a kind of collective municipality – in the Rhein-Hunsrück-Kreis (district) in Rhineland-Palatinate, Germany. It belongs to the Verbandsgemeinde Simmern-Rheinböllen, whose seat is in Simmern.

Geography

Location
The municipality lies in the Simmerbach valley in the central Hunsrück.

Constituent communities
Belgweiler has a small outlying hamlet named Wimmersbacherhof.

Land use
This breaks down in Belgweiler as follows:
Agriculture – 68.9%
Forest – 18.8%
Water – 1.0%
Residential and transport – 11.2%
Other – 0.1%

History
In 1285, Belgweiler had its first documentary mention. Beginning in 1794, Belgweiler was under French rule. In 1815, it was assigned to the Kingdom of Prussia at the Congress of Vienna. Since 1946, it has been part of the then newly founded state of Rhineland-Palatinate.

Politics

Municipal council
The council is made up of 6 council members, who were elected by majority vote at the municipal election held on 7 June 2009, and the honorary mayor as chairman.

Mayor
Belgweiler's mayor is Herbert Lang.

Coat of arms
The German blazon reads: 

The municipality's arms might in English heraldic language be described thus: Per bend sinister sable a demilion Or armed and langued gules and Or a fess countercompony argent and gules, issuant from base the head of an abbot's staff turned to sinister of the first.

The charge on the dexter (armsbearer's right, viewer's left) side, the Palatine lion, refers to the former landholders, the Dukes of Palatinate-Simmern and the Elector of the Palatinate. The countercompony (that is, with a two-row chequered pattern) fess refers to the Counts of the “Hinder” County of Sponheim, who owned the outlying Ortsteil of Wimmersbacherhof. The abbot's staff refers to another landholder, who held two estates in the village, the Ravengiersburg Monastery.

Culture and sightseeing

Buildings
The following are listed buildings or sites in Rhineland-Palatinate’s Directory of Cultural Monuments:
 Saint Anne’s Catholic Chapel (Kapelle St. Anna), Hauptstraße – small aisleless church, earlier half of the 18th century
 Hauptstraße – cast-iron fountain basin, from Stromberg ironworks, marked 1884
 Hauptstraße 8 – estate complex along the street; timber-frame house, commercial wing, marked 1872
 Hauptstraße 15 – Quereinhaus (a combination residential and commercial house divided for these two purposes down the middle, perpendicularly to the street), timber framing plastered, 19th century
 Mühlenweg 3 – former mill; timber-frame house, half-hipped roof, 18th century
 Wimmersbacher Hof 1 – timber-frame house, partly solid or slated, latter half of the 19th century, barn, partly timber-frame; whole complex of buildings

References

External links

Municipality’s official webpage 

Municipalities in Rhineland-Palatinate
Rhein-Hunsrück-Kreis